"Give Me You" is a song by American singer Mary J. Blige. It was written by Diane Warren for Blige's fourth studio album, Mary (1999), while production was helmed by Manuel Seal, featuring co-production from Nate-Love Clemons. The song was released as the third single from the album, outperforming both previous singles, "All That I Can Say" and "Deep Inside." The second-highest-charting single Mary, "Give Me You" peaked at number 19 on the UK Singles Chart, while reaching number 21 on the US Hot R&B/Hip-Hop Songs and number 68 on the Billboard Hot 100.

In the United Kingdom, the Niño remix was the main radio version. The Mary album was then re-released there with the Niño remix added to the track listing. NBA legend Michael Jordan makes a cameo in the music video.

Track listings

Credits and personnel
Credits are adapted from the Mary liner notes.

 La Tonya Blige da Costa – associate executive producer
 Mary J. Blige – executive producer, vocals
 Kirk Burrowes – executive producer
 Eric Clapton – lead guitar
 Michael Clemons  – drums
 Nate-Love Clemons – bass synthesizer, co-producer
 Paul Pesco – guitar
 Paul Riser – strings arrangement
 Manuel Seal – producer
 Hank Shocklee – associate executive producer
 Diane Warren – writer

Charts

Release history

References

1999 songs
2000 singles
Mary J. Blige songs
Songs written by Diane Warren
MCA Records singles
Contemporary R&B ballads
1990s ballads
Soul ballads